Canterbury High School is a high school located in Canterbury, New Brunswick. Canterbury High School is in the Anglophone West School District. The students in Canterbury are mostly from York County, New Brunswick.

See also
 List of schools in New Brunswick
 Anglophone West School District

References

Schools in York County, New Brunswick
High schools in New Brunswick